Ayal Dagnachew Asegu (born 18 January 2002) is an Ethiopian middle-distance runner who specializes in the 800 metres. She was the gold medallist at the World Athletics U20 Championships in 2021.

References

External links 

 Ayal Dagnachew at World Athletics

2002 births
Living people
Ethiopian female middle-distance runners
World Athletics U20 Championships winners
21st-century Ethiopian women